Fred Dixon (born November 5, 1949) is an American athlete. He competed in the men's decathlon at the 1976 Summer Olympics.  While Dixon had hopes of a medal, he was injured during his flight of the 110 metres hurdles.  Dixon struggled to continue but after a no height in the pole vault, he finished in 23rd place.

Dixon finished in second place at the 1975 Pan American Games, behind American rival Bruce Jenner.  His 1977 score of 8,397, set in the dual meet against the Soviet Union in Bloomington, Indiana gave him, at the time, the sixth best decathlon score in history behind Olympic champions Jenner, Mykola Avilov and Bill Toomey, plus Guido Kratschmer and Aleksandr Grebenyuk.  He was ranked in the world top 10 four years in a row, 1974-7, achieving #2 in 1975 behind Jenner and in 1977 behind Grebenyuk.  He finished in third place at the 1980 US Olympic Trials, which would have qualified him to another Olympics, except for the 1980 Summer Olympics boycott.

Dixon appeared in a reunion win Jenner on an episode of Keeping up with the Kardashians before Jenner had transitioned to Caitlyn Jenner.  After Jenner's transition he was asked to comment:

References

External links
 

1949 births
Living people
Athletes (track and field) at the 1976 Summer Olympics
American male decathletes
Olympic track and field athletes of the United States
Pan American Games medalists in athletics (track and field)
Track and field athletes from Los Angeles
Pan American Games silver medalists for the United States
Athletes (track and field) at the 1975 Pan American Games
Medalists at the 1975 Pan American Games